Esporte Clube Espigão, commonly referred to as Espigão, is a Brazilian football club based in Espigão d'Oeste, Rondônia. It is solely running as a youth team for the current season.

They won the Campeonato Rondoniense once.

History
The club was founded on June 7, 2008. Espigão won the Campeonato Rondoniense Second Level in 2008. They won the Campeonato Rondoniense in 2011, after beating Ariquemes in the final.

Achievements
 Campeonato Rondoniense:
 Winners (1): 2011
 Campeonato Rondoniense Second Level:
 Winners (1): 2008

Stadium
Esporte Clube Espigão play their home games at Estádio Municipal Luizinho Turatti, nicknamed Espigão. The stadium has a maximum capacity of 2,000 people.

References

Association football clubs established in 2008
Football clubs in Rondônia
2008 establishments in Brazil